The Spring Creek Fire was a wildfire near Fort Garland and La Veta, Colorado in Costilla and Huerfano counties in southern Colorado.

Origin and trial 
The Spring Creek Fire started on Wednesday, June 27, 2018 near Fort Garland, Colorado. Jesper Jørgensen (modified to Joergensen or Jorgensen in English), 52, a citizen of Denmark and reported by immigration authorities as being in the United States illegally because he had overstayed his visa, has been arrested and faces arson charges for allegedly starting the fire. He had been using a fire pit to grill food while camping in rural Colorado. Jørgensen claimed he was unaware of the open fire ban. He had presumed the fire in the pit was fully extinguished, but was woken from his afternoon nap by the smell of smoke a few hours later. He initially attempted to extinguish it himself, getting minor burns in the process, and when that failed he called 911. When the first firefighters arrived the fire had already engulfed trees and vegetation. The blaze was declared 100% contained on September 10, 2018. More than 140 structures were destroyed in the fire.

Shortly after his arrest in June 2018, Jørgensen was declared mentally incompetent, causing a delay in his case.

Evacuations 
The Forbes Park neighborhood near Fort Garland was under mandatory evacuations during the fire.

In Huerfano County, mandatory evacuations were ordered for Cuchara, Chama, Red Wing, Malachite, and Badito south of Highway 69. The community of Gardner was placed on "pre-evacuation" for a time.

References

External links
Official National Wildfire Coordinating Group website for the fire
Satellite image of the burn scar

Wildfires in Colorado
Huerfano County, Colorado
Costilla County, Colorado
2018 Colorado wildfires
Arson in Colorado